Laura Anne Jones (born 21 February 1979) is a Conservative politician who has been the Member of the Senedd (MS) for the South Wales East electoral region since July 2020, having previously held the same seat as an Assembly Member (AM) in the National Assembly for Wales between 2003 and 2007. Since 2017, Jones also served as a county councillor for the Wyesham ward in Monmouthshire County Council.

Background
The daughter of a farmer and a lecturer, Jones was born in Newport and brought up in Monmouthshire. She attended the University of Plymouth, where she studied politics.

Political career
She joined the Conservatives in 1996 and was involved in Conservative Future, the party's youth wing.

Elected to the Assembly at the 2003 election to represent South Wales East, she was the youngest member of the Assembly. She was appointed as the Conservative spokeswoman on sport, and sat on the Culture, Sport and Welsh Language, and Local Government and Public Services committees. Her profile was increased when she appeared on the BBC television programme Question Time in February 2004.

Jones lost her seat in the Assembly in the 2007 Assembly election when Plaid Cymru gained one seat in the South Wales East region at the expense of the Conservatives.

At the 2015 general election she contested the safe Labour seat of Islwyn for the Conservatives and finished third with 5,366 votes.

In the 2017 Welsh local elections she was elected to the Wyesham ward on Monmouthshire County Council winning 42% of the vote.

At the 2019 general election she contested the Labour seat of Blaenau Gwent for the Conservatives and finished third with 5,749 votes.

Following the death of Mohammad Asghar in June 2020, it was confirmed in July 2020 that Jones would become the MS for South Wales East, having been the next Conservative candidate on the regional list in the Assembly's 2016 election.

She was re-elected at the 2021 Senedd election.

References

External links
Laura Anne Jones MS Website

Offices held

1979 births
Living people
People from Newport, Wales
Conservative Party members of the Senedd
Wales AMs 2003–2007
Wales MSs 2021–2026
Alumni of the University of Plymouth
Female members of the Senedd
Conservative Party (UK) parliamentary candidates